Ferdinand of Fürstenberg may refer to the following members of the German nobility:

 Ferdinand of Fürstenberg (1626–1683), Prince Bishop of Paderborn and Münster, member of House of Fürstenberg (Westphalia)
Ferdinand of Fürstenberg (1661–1718), Drost in the Duchy of Westphalia, member of House of Fürstenberg (Westphalia)

See also 
 Fürstenberg (disambiguation)